Enough Said! is an album by guitarist Bill Jennings recorded in 1959 and released on the Prestige label.

Reception

AllMusic's Richie Unterberger stated "Jennings shows off the bluesy tone that made him a favorite of B.B. King on his composition "Tough Gain" and the group-penned "Blue Jams", but aside from these, most of the tracks are slow-to-midtempo shuffles—edifying yet not exciting. On "Dark Eyes", Jennings varies the pace in a more arresting fashion than usual, playing sleepy lines with a crying tone to achieve a near slide-effect before the tempo abruptly doubles and the tune drops into a bop groove in its last half". On All About Jazz, Derek Taylor said "Jennings’ maybe be a forgotten footnote today, but after listening to this disc it’s easy to imagine that he had his moment in the limelight shortly after these sessions hit the record shops".

Track listing 
 "Enough Said" (Alvin Johnson) – 6:40
 "Tough Gain" (Bill Jennings) – 4:15
 "Volare" (Franco Migliacci, Domenico Modugno)	7:00
 "Dark Eyes" (Adalgiso Ferraris) – 4:39
 "It Could Happen to You" (Jimmy Van Heusen, Johnny Burke) – 6:24
 "Blue Jams" (Bill Jennings, Jack McDuff) – 5:26
 "Dig Uncle Will" (McDuff) – 3:28

Personnel 
Bill Jennings – guitar
Jack McDuff – organ, piano
Wendell Marshall – bass
Alvin Johnson – drums

References 

Bill Jennings (guitarist) albums
1959 albums
Prestige Records albums
Albums recorded at Van Gelder Studio
Albums produced by Esmond Edwards